Transancistrus is a genus of suckermouth armored catfishes native to South America.

Species
There are currently 2 recognized species in this genus:
 Transancistrus aequinoctialis (Pellegrin, 1909)  
 Transancistrus santarosensis (M. Tan & Armbruster, 2012)

References

Loricariidae
Fish of South America